Yatenavis (meaning "stone bird") is an extinct genus of enantiornithine bird from the Late Cretaceous Chorrillo Formation of Santa Cruz Province, Argentina. The genus contains a single species, Y. ieujensis, known from a partial humerus.

Discovery and naming 
The Yatenavis holotype specimen, MPM-PV-23086, was discovered in sediments of the Chorrillo Formation near Estancia La Anita, Calafate, Santa Cruz Province, Argentina. This specimen consists of the distal right humerus.

In 2022, Herrera  et al. described Yatenavis ieujensis, a new genus and species of enantiornithine, based on these fossil remains. The generic name, "Yatenavis", combines the Aonikenk word for "stone" with the Latin word "avis", meaning "bird". The specific name, "ieujensis", is derived from "ieuj", the Aonikenk word for "snow". Yatenavis represents the eighth enantiornithine named from South America.

Description 
Herrera et al. (2022) concluded that Yatenavis  would have had a body size comparable to extant sparrows. The fossil material bears similar features to Late Cretaceous enantiornithines from various locations across the world, including Madagascar, North America, Patagonia, and Central Asia.

Paleoecology 
Yatenavis represents the southernmost record of enantiornithines. As enantiornithines are uncommon in high-latitude and cold environments (which were more frequently inhabited by ornithurines), the discovery of Yatenavis in the Chorrillo Formation is surprising. Yatenavis coexisted with the ornithurine Kookne and a large indeterminate enantiornithine. Non-avian dinosaurs, including the elasmarian ornithopod Isasicursor, the titanosaurian Nullotitan, and the megaraptorid Maip, have also been named from the Chorrillo Formation.

References 

Enantiornitheans
Extinct birds of South America
Prehistoric bird genera
Maastrichtian life
Fossil taxa described in 2022
Birds described in 2022